Lisitsyno is a rural locality (a village) in Zelentsovskoye Rural Settlement, Nikolsky District, Vologda Oblast, Russia. The population was 50 as of 2002.

Geography 
Lisitsyno is located 68 km northwest of Nikolsk (the district's administrative centre) by road. Shirokaya is the nearest rural locality.

References 

Rural localities in Nikolsky District, Vologda Oblast